The Hunter 30 is an American sailboat that was designed by John Cherubini as a cruising boat and first built in 1973.

The boat was also supplied as an unfinished kit for amateur completion as the Quest 30.

The Hunter 30 was the first design marketed by the manufacturer under that name. Later boats with the same name are commonly referred to as the Hunter 30-2 and Hunter 30T to differentiate them from the earlier unrelated design. Adding to the confusion, the 2006 Hunter 31-2 was also marketed as the Hunter 30.

Production
The design was built by Hunter Marine in the United States between 1973 and 1983, but it is now out of production. During its ten-year production run 1,000 examples were completed.

Design
The Hunter 30 is a recreational keelboat, built predominantly of fiberglass, with wood trim. It has a masthead sloop rig, a raked stem, a reverse transom, a skeg-mounted rudder controlled by a wheel and a fixed fin keel, shoal-draft keel, or a keel and centerboard combination. It displaces  and carries  of ballast.

A tall mast version was produced for lighter wind areas, with a mast about  higher. The boat was factory-fitted with a Japanese Yanmar diesel engine.

The design features a galley with a two-burner stove, sink, hot and cold water, a head with a stand-up shower, vanity and sink, nine port lights with bug screens, double life lines and a teak and holly cabin sole.

The centerboard version of the design has a PHRF racing average handicap of 186, while the shoal draft version of the design has a PHRF racing average handicap of 192. The tall mast version of the design has a PHRF racing average handicap of 180 and the tall mast version with the shoal draft keel has a PHRF racing average handicap of 192.

See also
List of sailing boat types

Related development
Hunter 30-2
Hunter 30T

Similar sailboats
Alberg 30
Alberg Odyssey 30
Aloha 30
Annie 30
Bahama 30
Bristol 29.9
Cal 9.2 
C&C 1/2 Ton
C&C 30
C&C 30 Redwing
Catalina 30
Catalina 309
CS 30
Grampian 30
Hunter 29.5
Hunter 306
J/30
Kirby 30
Leigh 30
Mirage 30
Mirage 30 SX
Nonsuch 30
O'Day 30
Pearson 303
S2 9.2
Santana 30/30
Seafarer 30
Southern Cross 28

References

External links
Official factory brochure

Keelboats
1970s sailboat type designs
Sailing yachts
Sailboat type designs by John Cherubini
Sailboat types built by Hunter Marine